Dr. Rajpal Kashyap (born 20 December 1976) is an Indian politician who is serving as a member of Uttar Pradesh Legislative Council since 2016 representing the Samajwadi Party. He was vice-president of Lucknow University Students' Union in year 2003–2004 and President in year 2004–2005. He is State President of Backward Cell of Samajwadi Party.

Personal life
Rajpal Kashyap was born to Siyaram Kashyap and Shreemati Kamla on 20 December 1976. He received his M. Phil and PhD degrees from the University of Lucknow. Kashyap is married and is an agriculturalist by profession.

Rajpal Kashyap is a Gold Medalist in Lucknow University for Good Educational character and best behaviour, helpful nature and social work in year 2004–2005.

Posts held

References 

1976 births
Living people
Members of the Uttar Pradesh Legislative Council
Samajwadi Party politicians
People from Hardoi district
University of Lucknow alumni
Samajwadi Party politicians from Uttar Pradesh